Ashete Bekere Dido (born 17 April 1988) is an Ethiopian marathon runner. In 2019, she won the Berlin Marathon with a time of 2:20:14.

In 2019, she also won the Rotterdam Marathon in Rotterdam, Netherlands with a time of 2:22:55.

Career 

In 2016, she won the České Budějovice Half Marathon held in České Budějovice, Czech Republic with a time of 1:10:40.

In 2020, she finished in 4th place in the women's race at the 2020 London Marathon held in London, United Kingdom.

In 2021, she finished 3rd in the 2021 London Marathon with a time of 2:18:18.

She competed in the women's marathon at the 2022 World Athletics Championships held in Eugene, Oregon, United States.

Achievements

Notes

References

External links 
 

Living people
1988 births
Place of birth missing (living people)
Ethiopian female marathon runners
Berlin Marathon female winners
21st-century Ethiopian women